Lucas Porcar Teixidó (born 18 February 1990) is a Spanish professional footballer who plays as an attacking midfielder.

Club career
Born in Sant Cugat del Vallès, Barcelona, Catalonia, Porcar was a product of local RCD Espanyol's youth system. He made his senior debut in the 2009–10 season with their reserves in the third division, managing 22 appearances with three goals but suffering relegation.

After an impressive second year, Porcar signed for Villarreal CF B of the second level. He made his official debut on 27 August 2011 against FC Barcelona B, and scored in a 2–0 away win.

On 1 August 2012, Porcar joined Real Zaragoza, being subsequently loaned to division two club Xerez CD late in the month. Both teams were eventually relegated and, on 31 January 2014, he moved to Belgian Second Division's K.A.S. Eupen until the end of the campaign.

On 31 August 2014, Porcar signed with CE Sabadell FC in a season-long loan deal. On 13 August of the following year, he returned to Espanyol B after being released.

In April 2016, Porcar was released by the Pericos after playing only 154 minutes for the B-side. Four months later, he joined CE L'Hospitalet also in the third tier.

Honours
Spain U17
UEFA European Under-17 Championship: 2007
FIFA U-17 World Cup: Runner-up 2007

References

External links

1990 births
Living people
People from Sant Cugat del Vallès
Sportspeople from the Province of Barcelona
Spanish footballers
Footballers from Catalonia
Association football midfielders
Segunda División players
Segunda División B players
Tercera División players
RCD Espanyol B footballers
Villarreal CF B players
Real Zaragoza players
Xerez CD footballers
CE Sabadell FC footballers
CE L'Hospitalet players
Challenger Pro League players
K.A.S. Eupen players
Spain youth international footballers
Spanish expatriate footballers
Expatriate footballers in Belgium
Spanish expatriate sportspeople in Belgium